Benton is a census-designated place and unincorporated community in Yazoo County, Mississippi. It was first named as a CDP in the 2020 Census which listed a population of 415.

Mississippi Highway 433 passes through the community.

History
Benton was settled in 1828 by William P. Gadberry. The first county court was held in his log home.

The county seat was moved from Beatties Bluff to Benton in 1829.  Benton developed quickly, and soon became the center of trade.  Benton was chartered in 1836, and incorporated in 1846.  In 1849, the county seat was moved to Yazoo City, to which a Mr. Benton wrote at the time:With the removal of the county seat, Benton began to decline and each year its population lessens, and the few houses left are dilapidated, dingy, decaying, and tumbling down.  Its population is about forty or fifty.  It has two or three small stores, which do a limited neighborhood business.

The Yazoo County Agricultural High School—one of the largest and best of its kind in the state—was constructed in Benton in 1912.  Benton High School was opened in 1930, and was used until the late 1990s. These educational facilities required new gravel roads to be constructed to Benton, which encouraged families to move back to the town.  New stores were built, a deep well was dug, and a telephone exchange was established.

The March Against Fear in 1966 passed through Benton.  Martin Luther King Jr. and others camped at the Oak Grove AME Church south of the town, where they were given food and water by members of the church and by the Woods family, who owned property next to the church.  A historic marker is located there.

Demographics

2020 census

Note: the US Census treats Hispanic/Latino as an ethnic category. This table excludes Latinos from the racial categories and assigns them to a separate category. Hispanics/Latinos can be of any race.

Parks and recreation
Benton Country Club is located in the town.

Education
The town is served by the Yazoo County School District. Residents are zoned to Yazoo County Middle School and Yazoo County High School.

Benton Academy, a private school, in located here.

Benton High School, originally Yazoo County Agricultural High School, was once located here.

Infrastructure
The town is served by the Benton Volunteer Fire Department.

Notable people
 Fred Waters, professional baseball player and minor league coach.
 John Sharp Williams, Minority Leader of the U.S. House of Representatives from 1903 to 1908; lived on nearby Cedar Grove Plantation.

References

Unincorporated communities in Yazoo County, Mississippi
Unincorporated communities in Mississippi
Census-designated places in Yazoo County, Mississippi